Richard Wilson (born 8 May 1960) is an English former professional footballer who played in the Football League as a midfielder.

Wilson spent most of his professional career in Finland. He played four seasons in the Finnish top level Mestaruussarja. Wilson scored 23 goals in 84 matches for PPT, Haka and FF Jaro. He was the top scorer of PPT in 1984, finishing 9 goals in 19 matches.

In 1987, Wilson started as a player-coach for FF Jaro in third tier Kakkonen. In two seasons, he managed to promote the club to top division. A year later, Wilson was sacked from the manager post. However, he finished the season as a player. In 1990, he spent the season as player manager of Norwegian second tier club Mjølner. Wilson ended his Finnish career in second tier club KPV in 1991.

References

1960 births
Living people
English footballers
Association football midfielders
Footballers from Orpington
Charlton Athletic F.C. players
Chelsea F.C. players
Hangö IK players
FC Jazz players
FC Haka players
FF Jaro players
Kokkolan Palloveikot players
English Football League players
Expatriate footballers in Norway